Presidential elections were held in Iran on 16 August 1985, and resulted in the re-election of the incumbent President Ali Khamenei.

Campaign
Freedom Movement of Iran called for a boycott.

Candidates
In July 1985, 50 people applied for the nomination, of which only 3 were approved:
Ali Khamenei, the current president and candidate of the Islamic Republic Party.
Mahmoud Kashani, lawyer and independent candidate.
Habibollah Asgaroladi, former Minister of Commerce and candidate of the Islamic Coalition Party

Disqualified
The following candidates were disqualified by the Guardian Council:
 Mehdi Bazargan, Secretary-General of Freedom Movement of Iran and former Prime Minister of Iran
 Mohammad Mousavi Khoeiniha
 Mohammad-Mehdi Abdekhodaei, Secretary-General of Fada'iyan-e Islam
 Babak Zahraei, Leader of Socialist Workers' Party of Iran

Results

References

Presidential elections in Iran
Presidential election
Iranian presidential election
One-party elections
Iranian presidential election
Ali Khamenei